Lonelyland is the first studio album (and second ever solo project) by Bob Schneider, released March 13, 2001. It was distributed through Universal and produced by Carl Thiel. A limited "Texas Edition" also appeared with three additional tracks. In 2020 Bob Schneider announced via Twitter that a vinyl pressing would officially be released in 2021.

Track listing
All songs written by Bob Schneider except as indicated.

"Metal and Steel" – 3:01
"Big Blue Sea" – 4:07
"Jingy" – 4:01
"Bullets" – 4:24
"The World Exploded into Love" – 3:01
"Round and Round" – 3:53
"Moon Song" – 4:14
"Madeline" (Schneider, David Boyle) – 7:37
"Tokyo" – 4:22
"Under My Skin" – 3:19
"Blue Skies for Everyone" – 3:33
"Better" – 2:54
"2002" – 4:11
"Oklahoma" – 7:15

Texas Edition additional tracks
"The King of the World" – 10:06
"The World Passes You By" – 2:29
"The Grave of Señor Corizo" – 2:23

References

2001 albums
Bob Schneider albums
Universal Records albums